Jan Dymitr Solikowski (1539, in Sieradz – 27 June 1603, in Lwów, Poland) was a Polish writer, diplomat, Archbishop of Lwów.

He was since 1564 secretary of King Zygmunt II August. He participated in the rebuild of structures of the church in Polish Livonia, after the wars of King Stefan Batory. In 1583 he became Archbishop of Lwów. He was co-author of the Union of Brest. He was author of several political and historical works.

Works
 Ziemianin (1565)
 Apocalipsis (1580)

External links
 Works by Jan Dymitr Solikowski in digital library Polona

Ecclesiastical senators of the Polish–Lithuanian Commonwealth
1539 births
1603 deaths
16th-century Roman Catholic archbishops in the Polish–Lithuanian Commonwealth
17th-century Roman Catholic archbishops in the Polish–Lithuanian Commonwealth
Archbishops of Lviv
Polish political writers
Diplomats of the Polish–Lithuanian Commonwealth
Canons of Włocławek